Andhra Pradesh Tribal Welfare Residential School (Boys) Eturnagaram, (A.P.T.W.R. School, Eturnagaram) is a residential school set up by a state government in India. The school was established in 1984 by the Andhra Pradesh State Government in the small village of Eturnagaram in Warangal district, Telangana Region

History
The former Chief Minister of Andhra Pradesh, N. T. Rama Rao and ITDA Eturnagaram led to the donation of 52 acres of land for the school.

Andhra Pradesh tribal Welfare Residential School is for the welfare of the tribal people in remote areas and in urban areas as well however the project was taken up to develop the tribal people by educating them and remaining them there values and their importance to participate in the society

References

External links

 

Boarding schools in Telangana
Schools in Telangana
Hanamkonda district
Educational institutions established in 1984
1984 establishments in Andhra Pradesh